"Stop Making This Hurt" is a song by American indie pop act Bleachers. It released on May 18, 2021, as the third single from their third studio album Take the Sadness Out of Saturday Night. The song was nominated for "Best Alternative" in 2021 MTV Video Music Awards.

Track listing
'''Stop Making This Hurt (A. G. Cook Remix) / How Dare You Want More (Verdine White of Earth, Wind & Fire Remix) - Single
"Stop Making This Hurt" (A. G. Cook Remix) – 4:19
"How Dare You Want More" (Verdine White of Earth, Wind & Fire Remix) – 3:00

Personnel

Jack Antonoff – vocals, songwriting, production, acoustic guitar, bass, drums, electric guitar, percussion
Patrik Berger – songwriting, production, tom toms
Annie Clark – background vocals
Blu DeTiger – bass
Sounwave – programming
Anna – saxophone
Bobby Hawk – violin
Evan Smith – saxophone, synthesizer
Zem - saxophone
Mikey Freedom Hart – bass, electric guitar
Sean Hutchinson – congas, drums
Laura Sisk – engineer
Chris Gehringer – mastering engineer
John Rooney – additional producer
Michael Riddleberger – percussion
Mike "Spike" Stent – mixing engineer
Jon Sher – assistant engineer
Matt Wolach – assistant engineer
Rob Lebret – assistant engineer
Will Quinnell – assistant engineer

Charts

Release history

References

2021 singles
2021 songs
Bleachers (band) songs
RCA Records singles
Song recordings produced by Jack Antonoff
Songs written by Jack Antonoff